The Mokai Tramway was a bush tramway constructed by the Taupo Totara Timber Company (TTT Co) to link their milling centre at Mokai with the New Zealand Government Railways line (NZR) at Putāruru in the Waikato region on the North Island of New Zealand. It was handed over to NZR on 12 June 1950, and the section from Putāruru to Kinleith Mill south of Tokoroa is still being used for goods transport as of 2018.

History 
The TTT Co line then went onwards south of Lichfield through what is now Tokoroa and Kinleith and crossed the Waikato River at Ongaroto.

At Ongaroto the company built a large timber bridge of locally sourced totara, designed by Public Works Department engineer Frederick Furkert. In later years this timber bridge deteriorated and was condemned, but the company could not afford to replace it immediately because its sawmill had burned down in 1928. In the last few years of service, trains arriving at the bridge would stop and the passengers and fireman would walk across while the driver gently opened the throttle and then jumped off. The train would slowly ease across the bridge before being stopped on the other side by the fireman, where everyone would reboard the train. This bridge was replaced in 1931 by a steel truss bridge with a central pier.

In general the TTT Co line was constructed to a fairly high standard for a bush tramway, with 1 in 30 grades and 30 metre radius curves. This reflected the company's ultimate intention to sell the line to NZR. In 1911 the TTT Co put forward a proposal to extend their line from Mokai into Taupo township via Oruanui. However, considerable objection was made to this proposal by the people of Rotorua. The Taupo District Railway League consequently lodged a complaint to the Member of Parliament for the district, William MacDonald, protesting the opposition being made by the Rotorua Chamber of Commerce. As time passed the proposal for the TTT Co scheme was eventually shelved.

The TTT Co line eventually closed on 26 October 1944. However the Government saw that the line had greater potential and in September 1946 acquired the first 29 km between Putāruru and Kinleith. This section of line opened again on 9 June 1947 under the control of the Public Works Department using steam locomotives purchased from the TTT Co.

Around the same time plans were being made for a large pulp and paper mill to be constructed at Kinleith. The line with its sharp curves, steep grades and light rails, needed to be significantly upgraded to enable heavy traffic. Reconstruction of the line began in 1949, reducing grades from 1 in 44 to 1 in 70 and curves from 201 metre radius to 322 metre radius. The rebuilt line was handed over to NZR on 12 June 1950.

The section from Putāruru to Kinleith Mill south of Tokoroa is still(2018) being used as part of the Kinleith Branch Line for goods transport.

Rolling stock

Locomotives

Wagons 
1 combination car for goods and passenger transport
1 guard van
25 flat wagon with side stakes

References

Citations

Bibliography

External links
TTT Co #7 Specifications and History
Alexander Turnbull Library TTT Co Gallery

See also 
 Taupo railway proposals

3 ft 6 in gauge railways in New Zealand
Logging railways in New Zealand
Rail transport in Waikato